Old South Church in Boston, Massachusetts, also known as New Old South Church or Third Church, is a historic United Church of Christ congregation first organized in 1669. Its present building was designed in the Gothic Revival style by Charles Amos Cummings and Willard T. Sears, completed in 1873, and amplified by the architects Allen & Collens between 1935–1937. The church, which was built on newly filled land in the Back Bay section of Boston, is located at 645 Boylston Street on Copley Square. It was designated a National Historic Landmark in 1970 for its architectural significance as one of the finest High Victorian Gothic churches in New England. It is home to one of the oldest religious communities in the United States.

History of the congregation

Established in 1669, Old South Church is one of the older religious communities in the United States. It was organized by Congregationalist dissenters from Boston's First Church and was known as the Third Church (to distinguish it from the First and Second Congregational Churches in the city). The Third Church's congregation met first in their Cedar Meeting House (1670), then at the Old South Meeting House (1729) at the corner of Washington and Milk Streets in Boston.

	
Members of the congregation have included founders Edward Raynsford, Thomas Savage, John Alden, John Hull, Judith Quincy Hull and parishioners Daniel Quincy, John Alden Jr., Samuel Adams, William Dawes, Benjamin Franklin, Samuel Sewall, and Phillis Wheatley. In 1773, Samuel Adams gave the signals from the Old South Meeting House for the "war whoops" that started the Boston Tea Party.

During the Unitarian Movement of the early 19th century, Old South was the sole Congregational Church in Boston to adhere to the doctrine of Trinitarianism. In 1816 Old South Church joined with Park Street Church to form the City Mission Society, a social justice society to serve Boston's urban poor. During the American Civil War, Old South became a recruiting center for the Union Army under minister Jacob Manning. Though the congregation was not entirely abolitionist, it strongly supported the Union cause. The conclusion of the Civil War was followed by an expansive time of increased inclusion for the congregation. Under minister George Angier Gordon the congregation moved from its meeting house at Washington Street to its Back Bay location in 1875, occupying the present church constructed on newly filled land.

Old South's commitment to urban ministry and care continued on into the 20th century becoming a segue for the inclusion of new members increasingly diverse by race, class, and sexual orientation. The congregation has formally adopted a platform of equality, social justice, and peace.

Architecture

The church building was designed between 1870 and 1872 by the Boston architectural firm of Cummings and Sears in the Venetian Gothic style. The style follows the precepts of the British cultural theorist and architectural critic John Ruskin (1819–1900) as outlined in his treatise The Stones of Venice. Old South Church in Boston remains one of the most significant examples of Ruskin's influence on American architecture. The architects, Charles Amos Cummings and Willard T. Sears, also designed the Isabella Stewart Gardner Museum. The exterior of the church is primarily built of Roxbury Conglomerate commonly called puddingstone. Many arches, and several walls of stone, are striped with alternating courses of yellow-beige and deep red sandstone. The porticos and large open arches in the campanile are decorated with simple plate tracery. The upper arches of the porticos are decorated with screens of ornate wrought iron. The building is roofed in alternating bands of red and dark gray slate and the roofline finished with ornamental iron cresting.

Campanile

A tall tower, or campanile, is the trademark feature of Old South and is visible from several Boston neighborhoods. The tower, on the western end of the church, rises to a height of 246' and houses the church's 2,020-pound bell. This is the second campanile built on the same site, designed by Allen & Collens it is similar to the 1875 design in its use of Moorish arches. The first tower, completed in 1875 along with the present Narthex and sanctuary, had begun to list by the late 1920s. The cause was determined to be the faulty footings and piles anchored in the soft former swampland. They were insufficient for the load of the tower. The congregation engaged the architectural firm of Allen & Collens to design a replacement campanile and a new chapel to be named in memory of the Reverend George Angier Gordon. The tower was dismantled, and early 1930s technology of steam shovel and steel pilings provided a lasting solution. Today, the pitch and height of the tower are tested annually and records attest to its enduring stability. The bell wheel, which by motion of a heavy rope swings the large bell, had deteriorated by the late 20th century requiring that the bell be rung by an external hammer. A faithful reconstruction of the original 1931 bell wheel, installed in early fall 2006, returned Old South's bell to "full swing."

Lantern

Centered above the Sanctuary on the east side of the church is a copper clad cupola surrounded by twelve ornate gothic arched windows. This feature is reminiscent of the cupolas of the Basilica of St. Mark in Venice. While the lantern provides a striking visual presence, it was also built with function in mind. In the days before mechanical fans and air conditioning, a series of mechanically operated louvers allowed for window panels to be opened to help cool the sanctuary inside.

Decorative arts

The interior of Old South is exuberant yet quietly modulates the mix of rich materials: highly carved Italian cherry woodwork, limestone, stenciled plaster, and stained glass. The sanctuary is entered from the narthex through a screen carved in the Venetian Gothic style from French Caen limestone. Hidden among the carved foliage that decorates the screen can be found a squirrel, lizard, owl, and snail. A similar theme of animals is also found in the carving of the building's exterior. The interior of the chancel at the east end of the church, behind the choir, is faced by a running screen of wooden arches with quatrefoil lunettes adapted from the upper arcade of the Doge's Palace in Venice. The stained glass windows are by the English stained glass manufacturers Clayton and Bell and were produced in the style of 15th-century English glass.

1875 Cummings and Sears interior

When Old South's church opened in 1875 it looked very much as it does today, based upon the design of Cummings and Sears. The walls were decorated in polychrome stenciling in shades of complex tertiary colors: a rose madder background with overlays of ochre, bay leaf green, warm gray, and persimmon, and highlights of metallic gold. Most of the interior structure, except for the carved wood frieze along the balconies, was already in place by 1875. High above the crossing of the transepts and nave is the lantern, or cupola. The ceiling of the lantern was painted a deep Prussian blue with a pattern of gilded stars to represent the firmament of God. The limestone tracery of the west wall of the sanctuary, with its foliage and animals, combined with the highly carved foliated woodwork and the overhead representation of the nighttime sky was intended to echo God's creation. Above the doors on the east chancel walls are glass mosaics of the tree of life by Antonio Salviati. A third mosaic by Salviati originally hung in the tympanum above the tower's front doors. That mosaic was relocated to the vestibule when the tower was rebuilt 1922-1937. The combined effect was extremely rich; at once a spiritual and sensuous experience, and in great contrast to the chaste interior of Old South Meeting House on Washington Street. Stylistically the 1875 interior was in harmony with the Ruskinian Gothic exterior, and expressed Ruskin's ideal that it is "in art that the heart, the head, and the hand of a man come together."

1905 Tiffany interior

In 1905 the congregation engaged Louis Comfort Tiffany to redecorate the sanctuary. Tiffany headed a group of artisans called the Associated Artists who worked largely in a style now described as the Aesthetic Movement. Tiffany was a part of an emerging American view of design in the United States, increasingly taking fewer cues from Europe. Tiffany had decorated Mark Twain's home in Hartford, Connecticut, the state rooms at the White House, and several Back Bay homes. In some ways Tiffany was an expected choice to redecorate Old South. He followed many of the ideas of John Ruskin; he believed in the dignity and importance of the human hand and eye in the decorative arts. Yet Tiffany arrived at Old South at a time when his gilded age style had begun a decline. A new wave of neoclassicism called Beaux-Arts, and the Colonial Revival style were replacing Victorian ornament with a simpler classicism. Theodore Roosevelt's 1902 White House renovation removed all of the Tiffany influence. In Tiffany's redecoration, Old South's stained glass windows were covered by insets of translucent tinted purple glass. The original polychrome stenciled plaster walls were painted purple, then stenciled in a series of geometric patterns with metallic silver paint intended to appear as mother of pearl inlay. Similar to Tiffany's work at Mark Twain's Hartford, Connecticut home, or his design for the White House's Red Room. The resulting work at Old South was a highly ornamented visual experience, unified by a limited color palette.

1950s minimalism

In the early 1950s, possibly influenced by the minimalism of the International Style, a second renovation of the Sanctuary took place. The mid-20th-century renovation largely ignored the architectural history of the church. Louis Comfort Tiffany's paint and stenciling was obscured by a coat of light gray paint, and the purple Tiffany glass installed over the stained glass was removed. The oculus of the cupola was closed up. In some ways the removal of decoration recalled the congregation's Puritan roots.

Recognition and restoration

Old South Church's building was designated a U.S. National Historic Landmark in 1970.

In 1984 a research-driven restoration was begun. The period of the building's construction was adopted, using old photographs and engravings as sources, and paint analysis to replicate original colors, the interior spaces were returned closely to their 1875 appearance. Walls were repainted rose madder and the original Cummings and Sears' stencil patterns were recreated. The cupola was reopened, once more admitting light to the Sanctuary below. Polychrome stenciling repeated the original palette of ochre, bay leaf green, warm gray, and persimmon with metallic gold.

Organ
The church's present organ, Opus 308, was built in 1921 by E. M. Skinner & Company of Boston for the Municipal Auditorium Theater in St. Paul, Minnesota, and brought to the church in 1985 when that building was demolished. The church had previously installed another Skinner organ in 1915; its successful inaugural concert series featured organists William C. Hammond, Gaston Dethier, Edwin Arthur Kraft, Charles Heinroth, and T. Tertius Noble.

The organ console is located behind the pulpit and is on a hydraulic platform so that it may be raised for concerts and recessed for worship services. The organ's pipes are located behind and to the right and left of the chancel and also at the back of the rear balcony above the entrance to the Sanctuary (32' and chamade). Ten ornately painted wooden pipes are mounted at the front of each side balcony.

In December 2008, construction at the adjacent MBTA Copley station created a crack in the church's exterior and damage in the sanctuary. Out of fear that its use might cause further damage, the organ was not used from then until just before Easter in 2009.

Bay Psalm Book
Old South Church is the owner of one of eleven remaining first-edition copies of the Bay Psalm Book. The Bay Psalm Book, printed in 1640 by Stephen Daye, "was the first book printed in the what became the United States." Until 2013, when one copy was sold at auction to David Rubenstein, Old South Church owned two of the eleven first-edition copies. Old South Church's copy of the Bay Psalm Book is currently housed in the Rare Books Department of the Boston Public Library.

Senior ministers

To date twenty ministers have served Old South's congregation as Senior Minister; they are:
At Cedar Meeting House
 Thomas Thacher 1670-1678
 Samuel Willard 1678-1707
 Ebenezer Pemberton 1700-1717
 Joseph Sewall 1713-1769
 Thomas Prince 1718-1730
At Old South Meeting House
 Thomas Prince 1730-1758
 Alexander Cumming 1761-1763
 Samuel Blair 1766-1769
 John Hunt/John Bacon 1771-1775
 Joseph Eckley 1779-1811
 Joshua Huntington 1808-1819
 Benjamin B. Wisner 1821-1832 (departed in 1832 to become a Corresponding Secretary of the American Board of Commissioners for Foreign Missions)
 Samuel H. Stearns 1834-1836
 George W. Blagden 1836-1872
 Jacob M. Manning 1857-1882
At Old South Church
 George Angier Gordon 1884-1927
 Russell Henry Stafford 1927-1945
 Frederick M. Meek 1946-1973
 James W. Crawford 1974-2002
 Carl F. Schultz Jr. 2002-2005 (Interim)
 Nancy S. Taylor 2005-2022
 Rich Spalding 2022-  (Interim)

See also

 Old South Meeting House
 List of National Historic Landmarks in Boston
 National Register of Historic Places listings in northern Boston, Massachusetts

References

 Aldrich, Megan. Gothic Revival. Phaidon Press Ltd: 1994. .
 Bunting, Bainbridge. Houses of Boston's Back Bay: An Architectural History, 1840-1917. Belknap Press of Harvard University Press: 1967. .
 Hitchcock, Henry-Russell. Architecture: Nineteenth and Twentieth Centuries. Yale University Press, Penguin History of Art, Second edition: 1963. .
 Hill, Hamilton Andrews. History of the Old South Church (Third Church) Boston, 1669–1884. Houghton, Mifflin and Company, The Riverside Press: 1890.
 Bigelow, George Frederick. An Historical Catalogue History of the Old South Church (Third Church) Private Distribution: 1883.
 O'Gorman, James F. On the Boards: Drawings by Nineteenth-Century Boston Architects. University of Pennsylvania Press:1989. .
 Placzek, Adolf K. Macmillan. Encyclopedia of Architects. 4 vols. Free Press: 1982. .
 Shand-Tucci, Douglas. Built in Boston: City and Suburb, 1800–2000. The University of Massachusetts Press: 1999. .
 Waters, Henry Fritz-Gilbert. "Genealogical gleanings in England." The New England Historical and Genealogical Register." Vols. 37-52, 1883-98.
 Withey, Henry F. Biographical Dictionary of American Architects (Deceased). Hennessey & Ingalls: 1970.
 History of the Old South Church of Boston.'' Published for the benefit of the Old South Fund: 1890.

External links

 Old South Church in Boston: official website
 The Diaries of John Hull, Mint-master and Treasurer of the Colony of Massachusetts Bay
 Satellite image of Old South Church
 Boston Old South Church at the site of the United Church of Christ
 High Victorian Gothic architecture in America
 Boston history and architecture
  2007

19th-century United Church of Christ church buildings
Bell towers in the United States
Church buildings with domes
Churches completed in 1874
Churches in Boston
Churches on the National Register of Historic Places in Massachusetts
Cummings and Sears buildings
Gothic Revival church buildings in Massachusetts
Landmarks in Copley Square
Members of the World Alliance of Reformed Churches
National Historic Landmarks in Boston
National Register of Historic Places in Boston
Stone churches in Massachusetts
Towers in Massachusetts
United Church of Christ churches in Massachusetts
Venetian Gothic architecture in the United States